Saidai Samiyappan Duraisamy (born 16 February 1952) is an Indian politician and, was a former and 48th Mayor of the Corporation of Chennai. He is the first All India Anna Dravida Munnetra Kazhagam (AIADMK) candidate to become the Mayor of Chennai from 25 October 2011 to 31 November 2016. He is also the founder and chairman of Manidhaneyam IAS academy, a free coaching academy for the aspirants of the Civil Services Examination, in Tamil Nadu.

Duraisamy was elected to the Tamil Nadu Legislative Assembly in 1984 from Saidapet. He stayed away from politics after the demise of M. G. Ramachandran. He contested the 2011 assembly elections as a candidate for the AIADMK from the Kolathur constituency, which he lost. He contested the mayoral election of Chennai corporation, and became the first AIADMK mayor of the city, in October 2011, winning the election by a margin of over 5.19 lakh votes. He took the oath of office on 25 October.

References

External links 
 

1952 births
Living people
Mayors of Chennai
All India Anna Dravida Munnetra Kazhagam politicians
Tamil Nadu MLAs 1985–1989